Chiclana Club de Fútbol is a Spanish football team based in Chiclana de la Frontera, Province of Cádiz, in the autonomous community of Andalusia. Founded in 1957, it plays in Primera Andaluza, holding home games at Estadio Municipal de Chiclana, with a 4,000-seat capacity.

Season to season

23 seasons in Tercera División

Notable former players
 Arteaga

External links
Official website 
Lapreferente team profile 

Football clubs in Andalusia
Association football clubs established in 1957
Divisiones Regionales de Fútbol clubs
1957 establishments in Spain